General elections were held in Sweden on Sunday 9 September 2018 to elect the 349 members of the Riksdag.

Overall results

By alliance

Elected MPs

Results by greater region

By percentage share

By votes

Results by statistical area

By percentage share

By votes

Results by constituency

Percentage share

By votes

Municipal summary
The blocs have been listed in accordance with the Prime Minister party vote.

By blocs
This is divided between pre–2018 affiliations, 2018–2021 affiliations and those after the non-confidence vote of 2021.

Results by municipality

Counties not in accordance with provinces include the three Småland counties of Jönköping, Kalmar (including Öland) and Kronoberg. From an enlarged perspective, the three provinces of Västergötland, Bohuslän and Dalsland form Västra Götaland, Örebro County is divided between three separate provinces centered around Närke. As a result, Västmanland County is smaller than the province. Stockholm County is also consisting part of the provinces of Södermanland and Uppland, the latter of which forms Uppsala County in its north. Farther north, Gävleborg is a merger between Gästrikland and Hälsingland, Västernorrland consists of Medelpad and Ångermanland, whereas Lapland is divided between Västerbotten and Norrbotten counties. Härjedalen is a single municipality roughly corresponding with the provincial borders, merged into Jämtland County.

Blekinge

Dalarna

Gotland

Gävleborg

Halland

Jämtland

Jönköping

Kalmar

Kronoberg

Norrbotten

Skåne

Skåne County was divided into four separate constituencies, a legacy of the previous divide between Malmöhus and Kristianstad counties before the 1997 merger as well as the large population.

Malmö

Skåne NE

Skåne S

Skåne W
Although the divide is not clear by using one decimal, the Sweden Democrats had 26.14% as the largest party compared to 26.13% for the Social Democrats, 50,059 votes to 50,041.

Stockholm
Stockholm was divided into two separate constituencies, Stockholm as a municipality and the rest of the county as "Stockholm County".

Stockholm (city)

Stockholm County

Södermanland

Uppsala

Värmland

Västerbotten

Västernorrland

Västmanland

Västra Götaland
Västra Götaland was divided into five separate constituencies, one covering the city of Gothenburg and the other three being geographically distributed between south, north, east and west.

Gothenburg

Västra Götaland E

Västra Götaland N

Västra Götaland S

Västra Götaland W

Örebro

Östergötland

Results by bloc

Since the Red-Greens and the Alliance were in existence during the election campaign, the bloc results are presented beneath, although both blocs split in 2019. As a result of the lengthy stalemate in the 2018 Swedish government formation, the Red-Greens and the Alliance blocs both split as two members of each bloc formed the January agreement between the Social Democrats and the Green Party in government and the Centre Party and the Liberals as confidence and supply parties. The latter two, along with the Left Party all chose to abstain in the vote on whether to nominate Stefan Löfven as Prime Minister. Due to the negative parliamentarism being in effect and fewer than 175 voting against, Löfven was able to remain in his position, even though he got fewer "yes" votes than there were "no" votes. The Moderates and Christian Democrats had nominated Ulf Kristersson as Prime Minister, with the Sweden Democrats also voting for him and all three parties voting against Löfven. The following municipal charts are detailing how the eventual PM preference vote share was split in municipalities and are not the same as the aforementioned bloc results.

Blocs by constituency

PM preference

By bloc

Post–2021 affiliations

Blocs by municipality

Blekinge

PM preference

By bloc

Dalarna
PM preference

By bloc

Gotland
PM preference

By bloc

Gävleborg

PM preference

By bloc

Halland

PM preference

By bloc

Jämtland

PM preference

By bloc

Jönköping

PM preference

By bloc

Kalmar

PM preference

By bloc

Kronoberg

PM preference

By bloc

Norrbotten

PM preference

By bloc

Skåne

Skåne County was divided into four separate constituencies, a legacy of the previous divide between Malmöhus and Kristianstad counties before the 1997 merger as well as the large population.

Malmö

PM preference

By bloc

Skåne NE

PM preference

By bloc

Skåne S

PM preference

By bloc

Skåne W

PM preference

By bloc

Stockholm
Stockholm was divided into two separate constituencies, Stockholm as a municipality and the rest of the county as "Stockholm County".

Stockholm (city)

PM preference

By bloc

Stockholm County

PM preference

By bloc

Södermanland

PM preference

By bloc

Uppsala

PM preference

By bloc

Värmland

PM preference

By bloc

Västerbotten

PM preference

By bloc

Västernorrland

PM preference

By bloc

Västmanland

PM preference

By bloc

Västra Götaland
Västra Götaland was divided into five separate constituencies, one covering the city of Gothenburg and the other three being geographically distributed between south, north, east and west.

Gothenburg

PM preference

By bloc

Västra Götaland E

PM preference

By blocs

Västra Götaland N

PM preference

By blocs

Västra Götaland S

PM preference

By blocs

Västra Götaland W

PM preference

By blocs

Örebro

PM preference

By blocs

Östergötland

PM preference

By bloc

School election
During the two weeks before the election, school pupils could vote in their schools. These votes do not count in the real elections. They exist for educational purposes and are counted for statistical and feedback purposes.

Total participation in the school election 2018 was 391,045 which is 79.8%. Of these votes 0.71% were blank and 0.29% were invalid votes for non-registered or non-existing parties.

References

General elections in Sweden
2018 Swedish general election